Eithne Farry is the former literary editor of ELLE. She is the author of "Yeah, I Made it Myself". She was a backing singer with Talulah Gosh and has reviewed a book for Marie Claire.

Works
 Yeah, I Made it Myself: DIY Fashion for the Not Very Domestic Goddess. (2006), W&N. .
 Lovely Things to Make for Girls of Slender Means. (2010), W&N. .
 Co-author of the Encyclopedia of Singles with Philip Dodd, Michael Heatley and Martin Noble; Paul Du Noyer as the General Editor.

References

External links 
 ¡Viva las craftivistas! at The Guardian, 29 May 2006
 The Late Show, BBC Radio London

Year of birth missing (living people)
Living people
British magazine editors
British non-fiction writers
British rock singers
British literary critics
British women literary critics
British radio presenters
British women radio presenters
British literary editors